Pan Yufei (born 23 June 2000) is a Chinese climber who specializes in bouldering. He finished third in the combined event as well as the bouldering event at the 2018 Asian Climbing Championships. He qualified for the combined event at the 2020 Summer Olympics, where he finished 14th out of 20 competitors.

References

Chinese rock climbers
Living people
2000 births
Sport climbers at the 2020 Summer Olympics
Olympic sport climbers of China
Sport climbers at the 2018 Asian Games
21st-century Chinese people
Sport climbers at the 2018 Summer Youth Olympics